The Goa Professional League (abbreviated as GPL, also known as the Selvel Goa Pro League for sponsorship reasons) is the premier state-level football league in Goa, India. It is organised by the Goa Football Association.

History
The official league in Goa, called the First division, began in 1951 and was organised by the Conselho de Desportos. The first Llague champion of Goa was Clube Desportivo de Chinchinim who beat Football Club of Siolim, to clinch the title.
 
League continued under the aegis of the Conselho de Desportos until the season of 1958–59, with Clube de Desportos de Vasco da Gama taking the title that year. In 1959, the Goa Football Association was established as the official administrative body of football and from that season onwards the league was conducted by GFA. The 1959–60 League was conducted by the GFA and Clube Independente de Margao emerged champions.

Until the 1968–69 season, the First division league was considered as senior. The GFA introduced "Senior division league" in 1969–70, which used to be the topmost division, but later was abandoned.

In 1970–71 season, apart from the Senior division league, there came into existence the First division league, which was split into two groups, namely the North Zone and South Zone. While the North Zone consisted of teams from Ilhas and Bardez, the South Zone accommodated teams from Mormugao and Salcete.

From the around 24 teams in the Second division, just one would make it to the First division, while there were around 60 teams battling it out in the Third division, of which two teams make it to the next stage. Subsequently, the teams finishing at the bottom of their respective pool are relegated to lower divisions.

In 1977 Goa Football Association introduced the Super league, with Salgaocar Sports Club clinching the title. With football continuing to develop at a fast pace, GFA decided it was time to push the game onto a higher platform. Goa emerged as the first State ever in the country, to go fully professional with the game.

The first Professional league was launched in the 1998–99 season. The five top teams of the 1997–98 Super League – Churchill Brothers, Salgaocar, Dempo, Vasco and VLM SC – automatically qualified for the Pro league.

The Professional league was expanded to six teams from the 2000–2001 season, after the GFA increased the participating number and competitiveness factor. Since 2002 the league was played as an eight-team format with home-and-away fixtures, making it 14 matches for each club. The GFA then announced that the 2011 season would be played with 10 teams under a new format.

Competition structure

Current clubs
The following 11 clubs are competing in the GPL during the 2022–23 season.

List of champions

For past winners at this level before 1997, see: List of Goan State Football Champions.

Top scorers

See also
Goa Police Cup
Bandodkar Gold Trophy

References

External links

 
Professional League
4